3137 Horky, provisional designation , is a background asteroid from the inner regions of the asteroid belt, approximately  in diameter. It was discovered on 16 September 1982, by Czech astronomer Antonín Mrkos at the Kleť Observatory in the Czech Republic. The likely stony asteroid was named for a hill near the Czech village of Horky.

Orbit and classification 

Horky is a non-family asteroid from the main belt's background population. It orbits the Sun in the inner asteroid belt at a distance of 1.9–2.9 AU once every 3 years and 9 months (1,360 days; semi-major axis of 2.4 AU). Its orbit has an eccentricity of 0.19 and an inclination of 2° with respect to the ecliptic.

The body's observation arc begins with a precovery taken at Palomar Observatory in November 1949, almost 33 years prior to its official discovery observation at Klet.

Close approaches 

It is also projected to make close approaches to 29 Amphitrite, 7 Iris and 10 Hygiea.

Physical characteristics 

In the SMASS classification, Horky is a carbonaceous C-type asteroid. However, based on the obtained albedo by the Wide-field Infrared Survey Explorer (WISE), it is rather a stony S-type (see below). As of 2018, no rotational lightcurve of this asteroid has been obtained from photometric observations. The body's rotation period, pole and shape remain unknown.

Diameter and albedo 

According to the survey carried out by the NEOWISE mission of NASA's WISE telescope, Horky measures 6.685 kilometers in diameter and its surface has an albedo of 0.207, which indicates that is likely of a stony rather than carbonaceous composition. It has an absolute magnitude of 13.3.

Naming 

This minor planet was named after a hill and its nearby village Horky in the Czech Republic, where the discoverer installed his first telescope in 1939. The official naming citation was published by the Minor Planet Center on 29 November 1993.

References

External links 
 Asteroid Lightcurve Database (LCDB), query form (info )
 Dictionary of Minor Planet Names, Google books
 Discovery Circumstances: Numbered Minor Planets (1)-(5000) – Minor Planet Center
 
 

003137
Discoveries by Antonín Mrkos
Named minor planets
003137
19820916